Roundabout homolog 4 is a protein that in humans is encoded by the ROBO4 gene.

References

Further reading